Tapa is a small town or city and a municipal council and administrative area in Barnala district in the Indian state of Punjab. Tapa is mainly known as Tapa-Mandi because Mandi word can be translated as grain market. As Tapa has been very famous for its grain market, many people from near villages come here to sell their crops and grains. This has been the main source of income and job opportunities for many people around this area. Tapa is well known for its historic Deras and Guruduwaras and for best economy in its district. A famous holy place named as Baba Math - (contact #7973031682), is the main attraction of this town. Tapa is situated at Barnala-Bathinda Main Road (NH 7) between Barnala and Bathinda, Moga and Mansa. It is 24 km towards Bathinda from Barnala and 42 km towards Barnala from Bathinda. Moga Road also passes through it towards Pakho-Kenchian.

Demographics
 India census, Tapa had a population of 18,887. Males constitute 54% of the population and females 46%. Tapa has an average literacy rate of 57%, lower than the national average of 59.5%: male literacy is 62%, and female literacy is 51%. In Tapa, 13% of the population is under 6 years of age.

Education

Schools
Government Boys Sen. Sec. School, Tapa
Government Girls Sen. Sec. School, Tapa
Holy Angels Public High School, Tapa
Sarvhitkari Vidya Mandir Public High School, Tapa
Shivalik Public Sen. Sec. School, Tapa
Jawahar Navodaya Vidyalaya, Dhilwan (Tapa)
Shama Public Sen. Sec. School, Tapa
Arya Samaj Public High School, Tapa
S.S.N Senior Secondary School, Tapa
Guru Nanak Dev Public High School, Tapa
Dashmesh Public High School, Dhillwan (Tapa Mandi)

References

Cities and towns in Barnala district